Jean-Charles and Jean-Carles is a French masculine given name. Notable people with the name include:

 Jean Charles, Chevalier Folard (1669–1752), French soldier and military author
 Jean-Charles Adolphe Alphand (1817–1891), French engineer
 Jean-Charles Bédard (1766–1825), Quebec-born priest and Sulpician
 Jean-Charles Brisard, international expert and consultant on international terrorism
 Jean-Charles Cantin (1918–2005), Canadian politician
 Jean-Charles Chapais (1811–1885), Canadian Conservative politician
 Jean-Charles Chebat (born 1945), Canadian marketing researcher
 Jean-Charles Chenu (1808–1879), French physician and naturalist
 Jean-Charles Cirilli (born 1982), French professional football player
 Jean-Charles Cornay (1809–1837), French missionary of the Paris Foreign Missions Society in Vietnam 
 Jean-Charles de Borda (1733–1799), French mathematician, physicist and political scientist
 Jean-Charles de Castelbajac (born 1949), fashion designer
 Jean-Charles de la Faille (1597–1652), Flemish Jesuit
 Jean Charles Dominique de Lacretelle (1766–1855), French historian and journalist
 Jean Charles de Menezes (1978–2005), Brazilian man shot at the London Underground
 Jean-Charles Faugère, French mathematician 
 Jean Charles Galissard de Marignac (1817–1894), Swiss chemist
 Jean-Charles Gicquel (born 1967), French high jumper
 Jean-Charles Gille (1924–1995), German-born Canadian engineer, psychiatrist and professor of medicine
 Jean-Carles Grelier (born 1966), French politician
 Jean-Charles Houzeau (1820–1888), Belgian astronomer and journalist
 Jean-Charles Jacobs (1821–1907), Belgian doctor and entomologist
 Jean-Charles Létourneau (1775–1838), notary and political figure in Lower Canada
 Jean-Charles Marchiani (born 1943), French prefect and politician
 Jean-Charles Moreux (1889–1956), French architect
 Jean-Charles Prince (1804–1860), Canadian Roman Catholic priest, teacher, seminary administrator and editor
 Jean-Charles Richard Berger (born 1924), Canadian politician
 Jean-Charles Sénac (born 1985), French road bicycle racer
 Jean-Charles Snoy et d'Oppuers (1907–1991), Belgian civil servant, diplomat and politician
 Jean-Charles Tacchella (born 1925), French screenwriter and film director
 Jean-Charles Taugourdeau (born 1953), member of the National Assembly of France
 Jean-Charles Trouabal (born 1965), French sprinter
 Jean-Charles Valladont (born 1989), French archer

Surname
Shemar Jean-Charles (born 1998), American football player

Other uses
 Jean Charles (film), a 2009 Brazilian film about Jean Charles de Menezes

Places
Isle de Jean Charles, Louisiana, a barrier island off the Louisiana coast

See also
 Dutch: Jan Karel
 English: John Charles 
 Italian: Giancarlo 
 Spanish: Juan Carlos
 Portuguese: João Carlos 

Given names
French masculine given names
Compound given names